This is a listing of official releases by Ramón Orlando, a Dominican musician, pianist, arranger, producer, and singer.

Albums

Studio albums

Compilation albums

Live albums

Singles

As main artist

As guest artist

See also
 List of songs written by Ramón Orlando

Notes

References

External links
 Ramón-Orlando at Discogs.com

Tropical music discographies